Titas may refer to:

Titas River, in Bangladesh, 
Titash Ekti Nadir Naam, a novel and film
Titas Gas, Bangladesh's largest gas company, after the Titas gas field. 
Titãs, the Titans, a Brazilian band
 Titãs (album)
Titas Upazila, an Upazila of Comilla District

See also
 Titus (disambiguation)
 Tita (disambiguation)